The Codex Bodley is an important pictographic manuscript and example of Mixtec historiography. It was named after the colloquial name of the Bodleian Library, where it has been stored since the 17th century.

History

While the exact date of its creation is difficult to establish, judging from its content and style, it was completed before the 1521 Spanish conquest of Mexico. The history of the Codex Bodley before becoming part of the Bodleian Library's collection at the beginning of the 17th century is not known. J. Eric Thompson, British archaeologist and Mayan expert, has suggested that the manuscript's previous owner was Bishop Heronymous Osorius of Faro, Portugal. The codex may have been looted by Robert Devereux, 2nd Earl of Essex, and given to his friend Thomas Bodley in the sixteenth century.

The Bodleian Library holds four other Mesoamerican codices: Codex Laud, Codex Mendoza, Codex Selden and the Selden Roll.

Description

The codex is made of deerskin that is 6.7 metres or 22 feet long. The animal skin was folded accordion style to form the distinct pages. Each page was then covered with a white base paint coat and then divided with red bands that extend horizontally. The obverse has five bands while the reverse is only divided into four. The condition of the codex has faded over time with many of the pages missing parts of the pictography.

Reading the codex

The manuscript can be read from right to left on two sides; the obverse and the reverse. The obverse consists of pages 1 through 20 while the reverse starts on page 40 and finishes on page 21. The obverse ends with a genealogy and names Lord Four Deer as the last lord of the Tilantongo dynasty. On the other hand, Page 21 of the reverse  names Lord Eight Grass as being the last king of Tiaxiaco. Eight Grass's name-glyph is at bottom center, above the 9-Deer  glyph (photo).

Genealogy

The Codex Bodley offers a relatively complete review of family relationships among the dynasties of the main cacicazgos (community kingdoms) in the Mixteca Alta region. This information is indispensable for anyone studying Mixtec kinship, policies around marital alliances, and peer polity interaction. Academic interest in the codex has focused on the Tilantongo and Tiaxiaco dynasties depicted on both sides of the manuscript,  who once lived in the modern day Mexican State of Oaxaca.  In 1949, the archaeologist Alfonso Caso was able to determine the primary line of descent for the royal family of Tilantongo and how the family affected Teozacoalco after the creation sagas that are described in the story of War of Heaven and Eight Deer stories. The Tilantongo people had an isolated past but the story of Eight Deer story provides a direct connection to the highest ranked dynasty in Mixteca. The reverse of the Codex Bodley tells the story from a different angle. It starts off by describing Apoala as a creation place (in contrast to Achiutla in the obverse). It goes on to describe the royal house of the Red and White Bundle after the War of Heaven. This is the rival family to the Tilantongo. Four Wind's biography is then used to connect a remote past that the family of the Red and White Bundle had to the promising future of Tiaxiaco.

Gallery

References

Pohl, John. "FAMSI - John Pohl's - Ancient Books - Mixtec Group Codices - Codex Bodley." FAMSI - John Pohl's - Ancient Books - Mixtec Group Codices - Codex Bodley. Foundation for the Advancement of Mesoamerica Studies Inc, n.d. Web. 17 November 2013.

External links

Index of Mexican codexes
Metropolitan Museum of Art Timeline of Mexico, 1000–1400 AD
MS Mex. d. 1 Images available on Digital Bodleian
MS Mex. d. 1 In the Bodleian Libraries catalogue of Medieval Manuscripts

16th-century books
Bodley, Codex
Bodleian Library collection